Riveros is a Spanish surname.

List of people with the surname Riveros
Bárbara Riveros Díaz (born 1987), Chilean triathlete
Cristian Riveros (born 1982), Paraguayan footballer
Galvarino Riveros Cárdenas (1829–1892), Chilean naval officer
Guillermo Riveros (1902–1959), former Chilean football defender
Jaime Riveros (born 1970), Chilean footballer
Juan Riveros (born 1946), former Paraguayan footballer
Marcos Riveros (born 1988), Paraguayan footballer

Spanish-language surnames